{{Infobox college softball team
|name = Louisiana Ragin' Cajuns softball
|CurrentSeason = 2022 Louisiana Ragin' Cajuns softball team
|logo = Louisiana Ragin' Cajuns wordmark.svg
|logo_size = 250
|university = University of Louisiana at Lafayette
|conference = Sun Belt Conference
|conference_short = Sun Belt
|division = 
|city = Lafayette
|stateabb = LA
|state = Louisiana
|coach =  Gerry Glasco
|tenure = 3rd
|stadium = Yvette Girouard Field at Lamson Park
|capacity = 2,790
|nickname = Ragin' Cajuns
|national_champion = 
|wcws = 1993, 1995, 1996, 2003, 2008, 2014
|super_regional = 2008, 2010, 2012, 2013, 2014, 2015, 2016
|ncaa_tourneys = 1990, 1991, 1992, 1993, 1994, 1995, 1996, 1997, 1999, ,2000, 2001, 2002, 2003, 2004, 2005, 2006, 2007, 2008, 2009, 2010, 2011, 2012, 2013, 2014, 2015, 2016, 2017, 2018, 2019, 2021, 2022
|conference_tournament = Southland 1984, 1987

Sun Belt 2000, 2001, 2002, 2003, 2004, 2005, 2006, 2008, 2009, 2010, 2011, 2014, 2016, 2017, 2019, 2021, 2022
|conference_champion = Louisiana AIAW1982

Southland 1984, 1987

Sun Belt2000, 2001, 2002, 2003, 2004, 2005, 2006, 2008, 2009, 2010, 2011, 2012, 2014, 2015, 2016, 2017, 2018, 2019, 2020, 2021, 2022''
}}

The Louisiana Ragin' Cajuns softball''' team represents the University of Louisiana at Lafayette in NCAA Division I college softball. The team participates in the Sun Belt Conference. The Ragin' Cajuns are currently led by soon-to-be third-year head coach Gerry Glasco after former head coach Michael Lotief was fired on November 1, 2017. Yvette Girouard was head coach from 1981 to 2000 leading the Ragin' Cajuns to 10 NCAA tournaments and three Women's College World Series appearances.  The team plays its home games at Yvette Girouard Field at Lamson Park located on the university's athletic campus.

NCAA Regional appearances

NCAA Super Regional appearances

NCAA College World Series appearances

Year-by-year results

Head coaches

See also
List of NCAA Division I softball programs

References

External links